Kang Jae-Won (born 30 November 1965) is a South Korean retired handball player and current coach for the South Korean women's national team.

He was voted World Player of the Year 1989 by the International Handball Federation.

Kang achieved a silver medal with the South Korean national team at the 1988 Summer Olympics in Seoul.

Honours

Grasshopper
Swiss League – 1990, 1991

Pfadi Winterthur
Swiss League – 1994, 1995, 1996, 1997, 1998, 2002
SHV-Cup – 1998

Individual
IHF World Player of the Year – 1989
Six-time MVP of Swiss Bundesliga

Manager

Pfadi Winterthur
Swiss League – 2002
EHF Challenge Cup runner-up –  2001

References

External links

1965 births
Living people
South Korean expatriate sportspeople in China
South Korean expatriate sportspeople in Switzerland
South Korean male handball players
Expatriate handball players
Olympic handball players of South Korea
Handball players at the 1984 Summer Olympics
Handball players at the 1988 Summer Olympics
Handball players at the 1992 Summer Olympics
Olympic silver medalists for South Korea
South Korean handball coaches
Olympic medalists in handball
Medalists at the 1988 Summer Olympics
Asian Games medalists in handball
Handball players at the 1982 Asian Games
Handball players at the 1986 Asian Games
Handball players at the 1990 Asian Games
Asian Games gold medalists for South Korea
Asian Games bronze medalists for South Korea
Medalists at the 1982 Asian Games
Medalists at the 1986 Asian Games
Medalists at the 1990 Asian Games
People from Bucheon
Handball coaches of international teams
Sportspeople from Gyeonggi Province